Matthew Kirk Edeson (born 11 August 1979) is an English former professional footballer who played in the Football League for Hull City. Edeson became Hull City's youngest player on 10 October 1992 at the age of 16 years and 60 days.

References

1979 births
Living people
English footballers
Association football forwards
English Football League players
Hull City A.F.C. players
Guiseley A.F.C. players
Winterton Rangers F.C. players
North Ferriby United A.F.C. players
Worksop Town F.C.
Hall Road Rangers F.C. players
Matlock Town F.C. players
Alfreton Town F.C. players
Pontefract Collieries F.C. players
Bridlington Town A.F.C. players
Goole A.F.C. players
Rossington Main F.C. players